−

The China Railways JF4 (解放4, Jiěfàng, "liberation") class steam locomotive was a class of superheated 2-8-2 steam locomotives for goods trains operated by the China Railway. They were originally built for the South Manchuria Railway (Mantetsu) in Japan in 1935.

History
After a number of incidents involving broken crankshafts in the Mikani class locomotives, as well as needing more motive power to meet the increase in goods traffic following the establishment of Manchukuo, the Mikashi class was designed in 1933 and put into production in 1935, with fifteen built in Japan that year, four by Kisha Seizō and eleven by Kawasaki. 

As the three-cylinder design of the Mikani class was deemed too complex, the Mikashi class returned to the proven two-cylinder layout.

Fuel consumption was also improved, with the Mikashi class using from 10% to up to 22.6% less coal than the Mikani class. Used primarily on heavy goods trains between Fengtian and Dalian to transport coal from the Fushun Coal Mine to port, they could pull up to sixty  coal hoppers.

Postwar
At the end of the Pacific War, the 15 Mikashi class locomotives were divided between the Dalian (13) and the Fengtian (2) depots, and all were taken over by the Republic of China Railway. Following the establishment of the People's Republic and the subsequent creation of the current China Railway, they became class ㄇㄎ肆 (MK4) in 1951, and class 解放4 (JF4, jiěfàng, "liberation") in 1959 and numbered 2701–2715. As during the Mantetsu times, they were primarily used around Dalian and Shenyang (formerly Fengtian).

References

2-8-2 locomotives
Kawasaki locomotives
Kisha Seizo locomotives
Railway locomotives introduced in 1935
Steam locomotives of China
Standard gauge locomotives of China
Rolling stock of Manchukuo
Freight locomotives